{{Infobox mountain
| name = Monte Lesima
| photo = Lesima.jpg
| photo_caption = 
| elevation_m = 1724
| elevation_ref = 
| prominence_m = 848
| prominence_ref = <ref name=pkb>'Monte Lèsima, Italy'', www.peakbagger.com</ref>
| map = Italy
| location =Lombardy / Emilia-Romagna, Italy
| range = Liguran Apennine
| coordinates = 
| type =
| first_ascent =
| easiest_route =
}}Monte Lesima''' is a mountain of the Apennines.

Geography 
The mountain is located on the border between Province of Pavia (Lombardy) and Province of Piacenza (Emilia-Romagna), Italy. It has an elevation of 1,724 metres. On its top near a big summit cross stands a radar station.

References

Mountains of the Apennines
Mountains of Lombardy
Mountains of Emilia-Romagna
One-thousanders of Italy